Amar Pal (19 May 1922 – 20 April 2019) was an Indian Bengali folk singer and author.

Early life
Pal was born in 1922 at Brahmanbaria in British India. His father Mahesh Chandra Pal died when Pal was 10. He learned folk songs from his mother Durga Sundari Devi. He also trained in classical music from Ustad Ayat Ali Khan, brother of legendary Allauddin Khan. Later Pal received training in folk music from Mani Chakraborty and Suren Chakraborty in Kolkata.

Career
Pal went to Kolkata in 1948 with Sachindranath Bhattacharya, a lyricist of All India Radio. In 1951, he first got a chance to sing in Akashbani Kolkata. He recorded thousands of folk and modern Bengali songs in the next seven decades. The satirical song "Kotoi Rongo Dekhi Duniyay", in Satyajit Ray's Hirak Rajar Deshe, made him famous. He worked in a number of Bengali films as a playback singer or music director.

Pal attended seminars and workshops on folk music worldwide and became the Vice-Chairman of the Paschim Banga Rajya Sangeet Academy.

He received the Sangeet Natak Akademi Award in 2007 from the Government of India and the Government of West Bengal awarded him the Sangeet Mahasamman in 2012 for his prolonged contribution in folk music. He was honoured by the Rabindra Bharati University and Burdwan University.

Pal also wrote two books, Banglar Loksangeet and Banglaar Nadir Gaan.

The notable devotional songs Pal sang are as follows:
 Prabhata Samaye
 Jago He Nagarbasi
 Jagia Laho Krishna Nam
 Ami Kothay Gele
 Amar Gour Kene
 Rai Jago
 Rai Jago Go
 Hari Din Toh  Gelo
 Prabhate Gouranga Nam
 Bharati Gouranga Loiya
 Mon Radhe Radhe
 Vrindabana Bilasini, etc.

Death
Pal died at SSKM Hospital, Kolkata after a cardiac arrest on 20 April 2019 at the age of 96.

References

External links
 

1922 births
2019 deaths
Bengali musicians
Bengali playback singers
Bengali singers
Indian male folk singers
Musicians from Kolkata
People from West Bengal
People from Brahmanbaria district
Recipients of the Sangeet Natak Akademi Award
20th-century Indian singers
20th-century Indian musicians
20th-century Indian male singers